Szymon Sowiński (born 23 December 1981) is a paralympic athlete, and shooter. He competed for Poland at the 2020 Summer Paralympics, in Mixed P3 25 metre pistol SH1, winning a silver medal.

He competed at the  2016 Paralympic Games in SH1 10m air pistol, finishing fourth.

References 

Living people
1981 births
People from Zielona Góra
Polish male sport shooters
Paralympic shooters of Poland
Paralympic silver medalists for Poland
Shooters at the 2016 Summer Paralympics
Shooters at the 2020 Summer Paralympics
Medalists at the 2020 Summer Paralympics
20th-century Polish people
21st-century Polish people